John King Davis  (19 February 1884 – 8 May 1967) was an English-born Australian explorer and navigator notable for his work captaining exploration ships in Antarctic waters as well as for establishing meteorological stations on Macquarie Island in the subantarctic and on Willis Island in the Coral Sea.

Early life
Davis's formal education, at Colet Court, London, and at Burford Grammar School, Oxfordshire, ended in 1900, when he and his father left London for Cape Town, South Africa.

Career

Early exploration work
Davis served as chief officer of the  during Ernest Shackleton's Antarctic expedition in 1908–1909.

First World War
At the outbreak of World War I in August 1914, Davis volunteered for active service, and was put in charge of the troop transport , carrying troops and horses to Egypt and England.

Later exploration work

Davis was Australia's Commonwealth Director of Navigation from 1920 to 1949. It was at the beginning of this period that he volunteered to personally set up the remote Willis Island meteorological and cyclone warning station in 1921–22. He was a contributor of articles to Walkabout.

Later life 
Davis was President of the Royal Society of Victoria 1945–1946, as well as being a Fellow of the Royal Geographical Society. Davis Station in Antarctica, established in 1957, is named after him. He was awarded the Polar Medal three times: in 1909, 1917, and 1934. In 1964 he was appointed a Commander of the Order of the British Empire. The Davis Sea, located off the Antarctic coast between longitudes 82°E and 96°E, is named after him.

Known in his lifetime as a "free thinker and plain speaker" and a "deepwater sailorman of the old school", John King Davis remained a lifelong bachelor and died on 8 May 1967 in Toorak, Victoria, aged 83.

Bibliography
Books authored by Davis include:
 (1919) With the Aurora in the Antarctic. Andrew Melrose: London
 (1921) Willis Island: a storm-warning station in the Coral Sea Critchley Parker: Melbourne.
 (1997) Trial by Ice. The Antarctic Journals of John King Davis (Edited by Louise Crossley) Bluntisham Books and Erskine Press: Bluntisham and Norwich

References 

1884 births
1967 deaths
Australian Antarctic scientists
Australasian Antarctic Expedition
Australian Commanders of the Order of the British Empire
Australian explorers
20th-century Australian non-fiction writers
British emigrants to Australia
English explorers
English male non-fiction writers
English non-fiction writers
Explorers of Antarctica
Fellows of the Royal Geographical Society
Recipients of the Polar Medal
Recipients of the pre 1941 Bronze Polar Medal
20th-century English male writers